Jean-Daniel Simon (30 November 1942 – 3 February 2021) was a French film director, screenwriter and actor. He directed eight films between 1968 and 1985. In 1975 he was a member of the jury at the 9th Moscow International Film Festival.

Selected filmography
 Vice and Virtue (1963)
 Love at Sea (1964)
 Adélaïde (1968)
 Camp de Thiaroye (1988)

References

External links

1942 births
2021 deaths
French film directors
French male screenwriters
French screenwriters